Franklin Wilcox Napuakekaulike De Lima (born July 8, 1949) is an American comedian from Hawaii.

Biography 
Frank De Lima is one of Hawai’i's most popular and beloved comedians. For over 40 years, this award-winning comic has been entertaining local residents and tourists alike with his zany parodies, outrageous sense of humor, and spontaneous creativity. Frank's specialty is translating issues - such as current events, fads, attitudes, and people - into fresh musical parodies. 

Comedy has been ingrained in Frank's life since childhood. While growing up in Pauoa Valley on the Island of O’ahu, Frank realized that he had a natural talent for making family and friends smile, especially at themselves. 

"The ability to draw laughter or a smile is one of the greatest gifts you can give to people," states the proclaimed Portuguese Prince of Hawaiian Comedy. "Laughter makes a happy heart." 

Frank personifies Hawaii's diverse ethnicities and cultures. His ethnic background, which is self-described as "veritable Portuguese Soup" and "Chop Suey Nation," consists of Portuguese, Hawaiian, Irish, Chinese, English, Spanish, and Scottish. He celebrates, not disregards, ethnic differences and integrates them into his comedic routines. 

"Humor breaks down barriers and being able to laugh at oneself is the first step down that road," Frank explains. 

After receiving his graduate degree from St. Patrick's Seminary & University in California, Frank returned home and started his professional career - as a singer. By successfully combining his singing talents with his propensity for comic satire, Frank soon became one of the hottest tickets in Hawai’i's entertainment scene. 

Through the years, Frank - along with his musical sidekick duo of David Kauahikaua and Bobby Nishida - has headlined nightclubs, performed at sold-out concerts and events throughout Hawai’i and along the West Coast, and produced numerous audio & visual works. Thus far, Frank's catalog includes three videos and 17 comedy albums. During his over 40-year career, Frank has received an unprecedented 14 Na Hoku Hanohano Awards, which is Hawai’i's GRAMMY equivalent. 

But comedy is not Frank's only passion. In 1980, Frank founded the Frank De Lima’s Student Enrichment Program. This non-profit organization is devoted to helping Hawai’i's students understand the importance of reading, studying, laughing, and family, and managing major emotional and physical life transitions. Since the Program's inception, Frank’s visits have increased to 300 schools state-wide biennially. In recognition of his commitment to Hawai’i's keiki (children), Frank has received numerous honors, including Governor Cayetano's Kilohana Award for Volunteer of the Year and the Ellison S. Onizuka Memorial Award from the National Education Association.

Discography
 "A Taste of Malasadas" - originally released in 1977
 "The Best of De Lima Too!!" – 1991

References

American male comedians
American people of Portuguese descent
American people of English descent
American people of Irish descent
American people of Spanish descent
American people of Scottish descent
Place of birth missing (living people)
American people of Chinese descent
American people of Native Hawaiian descent
Damien Memorial School alumni
1949 births
Living people
20th-century American comedians
21st-century American comedians